West Side Ryders is a compilation album by rapper C-Bo, released June 10, 2003, on West Coast Mafia Records.

Track listing

Album chart positions

References 

2003 compilation albums
Albums produced by Bosko
Albums produced by Rhythum D
C-Bo albums
Gangsta rap compilation albums